Anthony Cedric Sebastian Steane (14 December 1893 – 19 December 1976), known by the stage name Jack Trevor, was a British film actor of the silent and early sound era. Based in Weimar (and later Nazi) Germany, he acted in 67 films between 1922 and 1943. He was later convicted by the Central Criminal Court of collaboration for appearing in multiple propaganda films of the Nazi regime, but his sentence was overturned on the basis that he'd only worked under duress.

Early life and military service
Trevor was born Anthony Cedric Sebastian Steane in London in 1893, to upper-class parents. He studied at New College, Oxford, and was drafted into the British Army, where he was posted to the Manchester Regiment. By 1915, he was posted to Gallipoli and later France as an acting Second Lieutenant. He was wounded in action in 1916, and was for a time invalidated out of service. 

In June 1917, while under orders to return to France after sick leave, he absented himself; and in December was convicted at the Central Criminal Court on a charge of obtaining jewelry by fraud and sentenced to 6 months imprisonment at Wormwood Scrubs. He was cashiered that same month, but was later re-drafted in March 1918. He subsequently went deserted again in May of that year. He would later claim to have won the Military Cross for his service, but records indicate this was false.

Germany and film stardom
Sometime after the war, he married an Austrian woman named Alma, supposedly an illegitimate daughter of Crown Prince Rudolf, who committed suicide a year into their marriage.  

He moved to Berlin in 1922 following an offer with producer Frederic Zelnik, and began acting in silent films under the stage name "Jack Trevor." He was often cast as a prototypical "English gentleman" or other sophisticates, in everything from minor to major roles. 

He remarried and had two sons, re-settling in Oberammergau and living off his affluent family's vast fortune.

Nazi propaganda films
In September 1939, he was arrested and interned by the Gestapo as an enemy alien. Propaganda Minister Joseph Goebbels demanded he record English-language radio broadcasts for the regime. Though he initially refused, he later complied due to threats against himself and his family. Over the course of the war, he appeared in several propaganda films, including Carl Peters, Ohm Krüger, and My Life for Ireland.

Post-war life and trial
After the surrender and dissolution of the Nazi government, Trevor surrendered himself to Allied forces. He was extradited to the United Kingdom in 1945 and interned for two years while awaiting trial for war crimes. In 1947, he was convicted by the Central Criminal Court of "doing acts likely to assist the enemy with intent to assist the enemy" and sentenced to three years imprisonment (of a possible life sentence), but later successfully appealed the conviction, on the grounds that he was acting under duress. The case is recorded as R v Steane.

Trevor eventually moved to Deal, Kent, and died in 1976.

Filmography

 Pages of Life (1922) as Lord Mainwaring
 The Grass Orphan (1922)
 Petticoat Loose (1922) as Max Lorraine
 Not for Sale (1924) as Desmond North
 The Venus of Montmartre (1925) as the Prince of Chéran
 Den of Iniquity (1925) as Hellmuth Roeder
 The Second Mother (1925) as Baron Fred Brochstädt
 Secrets of a Soul (1926) as Erich
 Love is Blind (1926) as the film director
 Cab No. 13 (1926) as François Tapin
 The Golden Butterfly (1926) as Teddy Aberdeen
 Trude (1926)
 The Great Duchess (1926) as the adventurer
 Rhenish Girls and Rhenish Wine (1927) as Baron Wendlingen
 The Love of Jeanne Ney (1927)
 Circle of Lovers (1927) as Paul Neurath
 The Hunt for the Bride (1927) as Bill Hoot
 Chance the Idol (1927) as Golding
 The Great Unknown (1927)  as Major Paul Roy Amery
 Intoxicated Love (1927)  as Robert Elliot
 The Prisoners of Shanghai (1927) as Consul Ralph Sinclair
 Nameless Woman (1927) as Frank Milton
 The Girl with the Five Zeros (1927) as the swindler
 The Catwalk (1927) as Baron Boreslav von Schrandens Sohn
 The Island of Forbidden Kisses (1927)
 The Devious Path (1928) as Walter Frank
 The Countess of Sand (1928)
 Rasputin, the Holy Sinner (1928) as Prince Yusupov
 The Duty to Remain Silent (1928) as Robert
 Folly of Love (1928)
 Love's Masquerade (1928) as the writer
 Modern Pirates (1928) as Major John Brent
 Champagne (1928) as the officer
 The Lady and the Chauffeur (1928) as Jan Derrik
 The Alley Cat (1929) as Jimmy Rice
 Fräulein Else (1929) as Paul
 Three Around Edith (1929) as Thomas Morland
 Anesthesia (1929) as René Vernon
 My Sister and I (1929) as Baron Udo von Ebenhausen
 The White Roses of Ravensberg (1929) as Dr. Marcel Hochwald
 Bright Eyes (1929) as Jean
 Foolishness of His Love (1929)
 The Great Longing (1930) as himself
 Two Worlds (1930) as Capitain Stanislaus
 The Song of the Nations (1931)
 A Voice Said Goodnight  (1932)  as Gerald Creighton
 The Five Accursed Gentlemen (1932) as Strawber
 Lily Christine (1932) as Ivor Summerset
 Hangmen, Women and Soldiers (1935) as Capitain MacCallum
 Engel mit kleinen Fehlern (1936)
 Under Blazing Heavens (1936) as Mr. Hicks
 Das schöne Fräulein Schragg (1937)
 Cause for Divorce (1937)  as Fenton
 Tango Notturno (1937) as Pilot Commander
 Mirror of Life (1938)
 Women for Golden Hill (1938) as Larry
 Napoleon Is to Blame for Everything (1938) as Minister
 Police Report (1939)
 Menschen vom Varieté (1939)
 Der letzte Appell (1939)
 Carl Peters (1941) as the British Consul of Zanzibar
 Uncle Kruger (1941) as British Officer
 My Life for Ireland (1941) as the president of the martial court
 Rembrandt (1942)
 The Eternal Tone (1943) as the American
 Immensee (1943) as Kellner

See also
R v Steane

References

External links

Central Criminal Court Depositions - CRIM 1/1797

1893 births
1976 deaths
20th-century English male actors
English male film actors
English male silent film actors
Male actors from Berlin
English broadcasters for Nazi Germany
British expatriates in Germany
British emigrants to Germany
British Army personnel of World War I
Desertion